Metropolitan City of Rome Capital is an area of local government at the level of metropolitan city in the Lazio region of the Italian Republic. It comprises the territory of the city of Rome and 120 other municipalities (comuni) in the hinterland of the city. With more than 12.3 million inhabitants, it is the largest metropolitan city in Italy.

It was established on 1 January 2015 by the terms of Law 142/1990 (Reform of local authorities) and by Law 56/2014. It superseded the Province of Rome. The Metropolitan City of Rome Capital is headed by the Metropolitan Mayor (Sindaco metropolitano) and governed by the Metropolitan Council (Consiglio metropolitano). Roberto Gualtieri is the incumbent mayor, having taken office on 21 October 2021.

Administration

Metropolitan Council
Metropolitan cities were given administrative powers equivalent to those of a province. This was done to improve the performance of local administration and to cut local spending by better coordinating the municipalities in providing basic services (including transport, school and social programs) and environment protection. In this policy framework, the Mayor of Rome is also designated to exercise the functions of Metropolitan mayor, presiding over a Metropolitan Council formed by 24 mayors of municipalities within the Metro.

The Metropolitan Council of the City was elected on 20 December 2021:

List of Metropolitan Mayors of Rome

Sub-divisions

There are 121 sub-divisions or comunes of Metropolitan City of Rome Capital. The comunes with the largest populations are listed below.

Geography

The Metropolitan City of Rome Capital covers almost one-third of the territory of Lazio. It occupies the flat area of the Roman and the Tiber Valley to the mountains and dell'Aniene Lucretili Sabini and, in addition to the mountainous regions of the Tolfa and Monti Sabatini to the north-west, the area of the mountains Tiburtini Prenestini Simbruini and east, the area of the Colli Albani and the northern foothills of the mountains, and high Lepine Sacco valley to the south-east. In the territory there are several lakes, almost all of volcanic origin, which are concentrated in the north-west of the mountains and Sabatini in the south-east of the Colli Albani.

Transport

The Metropolitan City of Rome Capital is the centre of a radial network of roads that roughly follow the lines of the ancient Roman roads which began at the Capitoline Hill and connected Rome with its empire.

Due to its location in the centre of the Italian peninsula, Rome is the principal railway node for central Italy. Rome's main railway station, Termini, is one of the largest railway stations in Europe and the most heavily used in Italy, with around 400 thousand travellers passing through every day. The second-largest station in the city, Roma Tiburtina, has been redeveloped as a high-speed rail terminus.

Rome is served by three airports. The intercontinental Leonardo da Vinci International Airport is Italy's chief airport, is located within the nearby Fiumicino, south-west of Rome. The older Rome Ciampino Airport is a joint civilian and military airport. It is commonly referred to as "Ciampino Airport", as it is located beside Ciampino, south-east of Rome.

Although the city has its own quarter on the Mediterranean Sea (Lido di Ostia), this has only a marina and a small channel-harbour for fisher boats.

A 3-line metro system called the Metropolitana operates in the Metropolitan City of Rome. Construction on the first branch started in the 1930s. The line had been planned to quickly connect the main railway station with the newly planned E42 area in the southern suburbs, where the 1942 World Fair was supposed to be held. The event never took place because of war, but the area was later partly redesigned and renamed EUR (Esposizione Universale di Roma: Rome Universal Exhibition) in the 1950s to serve as a modern business district. The line was finally opened in 1955, and it is now the south part of the B Line.

The A line opened in 1980 from Ottaviano to Anagnina stations, later extended in stages (1999–2000) to Battistini. In the 1990s, an extension of the B line was opened from Termini to Rebibbia. This underground network is generally reliable (although it may become very congested at peak times and during events, especially the A line) as it is relatively short.

The A and B lines intersect at Roma Termini station. A new branch of the B line (B1) opened on 13 June 2012 after an estimated building cost of €500 million.

It will partly replace the existing Termini-Pantano rail line. It will feature full automated, driverless trains. The first section with 15 stations connecting Pantano with the quarter of Centocelle in the eastern part of the city, opened on 9 November 2014. The end of the work was scheduled in 2015, but archaeological findings often delay underground construction work.

A fourth line, D line, is also planned. The first section was projected to open in 2015 and the final sections before 2035, but due to the city's financial crisis the project has been put on hold.

References

External links
 https://facebook.com/CittametropolitanaRomaCapitale

 
2015 establishments in Italy
Populated places established in 2015
Rome
Rome
Province of Rome